In the Chicago mayoral election of 1871, Joseph Medill defeated Republican/Democratic nominee Charles C. P. Holden by a landslide 46-point margin.

Holden was president of the Common Council, and constructed the Landmark Holden Block in 1872.

The election took place on November 7, a month after Chicago suffered the calamity of the Great Chicago Fire.

The administration of the election was challenging because the majority of Chicago's voting records had been incinerated by the Great Chicago Fire, meaning that there were few resources to prevent individuals from voting more than once.

Campaign
The election was greatly shaped by the fire.

Incumbent Democrat Roswell B. Mason did not run for reelection.

Holden was supported by both the city's Republican Party and Democratic Party. 

Medill ran on the "Union-Fireproof" ticket. The Union-fireproof ticket had been formed by a group of Chicago businessmen and civic leaders led by Carter Harrison Sr. Despite their drafting of Medill, he initially refused the nomination. Medill was preoccupied with the task of running his Chicago Tribune newspaper business, particularly after its headquarters building had been lost in the fire. However, after several days of being pressured to accept the nomination, he agreed to run on the condition that the Illinois State Legislature would enact a new city charter for Chicago which gave more formal power to the mayor. In his speech accepting the nomination, he noted that he would likely resign as mayor if the legislature failed to pass such a charter. The ticket was a liberal reform one.

In his campaign, Medill promised to enact strengthened building regulations and fire codes. Medill also promised to rebuild the city, implement blue laws, and address the city's crime problems.

Holden had been nominated by the local Democratic Party organization, which at the time was very weakly organized. The party's main base of support came from the city's immigrant community. Holden was the alderman from the city's Tenth Ward and had served as president of the City Council during Mason's mayoralty.

The campaigning period lasted only roughly two weeks.

Results
Medill won a landslide victory. The "Union-Fireprooof" ticket also saw its nominees for City Treasurer and City Collector elected as well. However, seven aldermen were elected from the Democratic ticket, providing the Democrats with one-third of the city council.

Medill was the city's first foreign-born mayor. Only one subsequent mayor has been foreign born, Anton Cermak.

References

Mayoral elections in Chicago
Chicago
Chicago
1870s in Chicago